Violenbach is a river of Lower Saxony and North Rhine-Westphalia, Germany.

The violenbach springs south of Borgholzhausen. It is a right tributary of the Else east of Melle.

See also
List of rivers of Lower Saxony
List of rivers of North Rhine-Westphalia

References

Borgholzhausen
Rivers of Lower Saxony
Rivers of North Rhine-Westphalia
Rivers of Germany